Gananoque Lake is a lake of eastern Ontario, Canada, located about 10 miles north of the town of Gananoque.

See also
List of lakes in Ontario

References
 National Resources Canada

Lakes of Leeds and Grenville United Counties